Boiga wallachi, also known commonly as the Nicobar cat snake, is a species of rear-fanged snake in the family Colubridae. The species is endemic to the Nicobar Islands.

Geographic range
B. wallachi is known from the islands of Great Nicobar and Little Nicobar.

Etymology
The specific name, wallachi, is in honour of Van Wallach, an American herpetologist.

Description
The head is small and distinct from the neck; the eyes are large. The dorsum is cinnamon-coloured and edged with brownish olive. The ventrum is spectrum yellow with dark, rounded blotches.

Ecology
It seems to be strictly terrestrial. It feeds on eggs (including those of domestic chickens) as well as on frogs and other small animals.

Reproduction
B. wallachi is oviparous.

Conservation
As of 2013 populations of B. wallachi seemed stable, although they might have been significantly reduced by the 2004 Indian Ocean tsunami. B. wallachi can enter anthropogenic habitats to forage, but it is unclear whether it can persist in such habitats. The species occurs within the Great Nicobar Biosphere Reserve, but there is no strict habitat protection.

References

Further reading
Das I (2002). A Photographic Guide to Snakes and other Reptiles of India. Sanibel Island, Florida: Ralph Curtis Books. 144 pp. . (Boiga wallachi, p. 26).
Whitaker R, Captain A (2008). Snakes of India, The Field Guide. Chennai: Draco Books. 495 pp. .

Wallachi
Snakes of India
Endemic fauna of the Nicobar Islands
Reptiles described in 1998
Taxa named by Indraneil Das